Ramdas Agarwal (17 March 1937 – 26 January 2017) was an Indian politician of the Bharatiya Janata Party (BJP). He was a member of the Parliament of India representing Rajasthan in the Rajya Sabha, the upper house of the Parliament.

References

External links
 Profile on Rajya Sabha website

1937 births
2017 deaths
Rajya Sabha members from Rajasthan
Bharatiya Janata Party politicians from Rajasthan
Rajya Sabha members from the Bharatiya Janata Party